Born to Roll may refer to:

 Born to Roll (album), an album by Johnny Reid
 "Born to Roll" (song), a song by Masta Ace Incorporated